The 21st Yukon Territorial Council was in session from 1967 to 1970. Membership was set by a general election held in 1967. The council was non-partisan and had merely an advisory role to the federally appointed Commissioner.

Members elected

References

Yukon Legislative Assemblies
Yukon politics-related lists